Chauburji  (Punjabi and , "Four Towers") is a rapid transit station serving the Orange Line of the Lahore Metro in Lahore, Pakistan. It is near the Chauburji monument.

History 

In August 2016, the Court halted construction of the metro within 200 feet of any heritage site, including Chauburji in order to prevent what UNESCO termed as potentially "irreversible damage", were the line to be constructed in its present form. The Chauburji station was originally planned to be underground, but it was changed to an elevated station to comply with the UNESCO regulations.

The Chauburji station was opened after the inauguration of the Orange Line on 25 October 2020.

See also 
 Lahore Metrobus
 Orange Line (Lahore Metro)
 Lahore Metro
 Transport in Lahore

References 

Transport in Lahore
China–Pakistan Economic Corridor
Railway stations opened in 2020
Lahore Metro stations